Randal MacDonnell or McDonnell may refer to:

Randal MacDonnell, 1st Earl of Antrim (died 1636), son of Sorley Boy MacDonnell
Randal MacDonnell, 1st Marquess of Antrim (1645 creation) (1609–1683), son of the 1st Earl of Antrim
Randal MacDonnell, 1st Marquess of Antrim (1789 creation), Earl of Antrim
Randal MacDonnell, 4th Earl of Antrim (1680–1721), Irish aristocrat
Randal McDonnell, 8th Earl of Antrim (1911–1977), diplomat, activist, soldier and administrator from Northern Ireland
Randal McDonnell, 10th Earl of Antrim (born 1967), Scottish landowner